The Crawley and District Football League was a football competition in England. In its final season, it had three divisions, headed by the Premier Division, with Divisions One and Two below. The league members could apply for promotion to the Combined Counties League or the Sussex County Football League.  After the 2005-06 season, South Park made the jump into the CCL.  The Crawley & District League Premier Division sat at step 7 (or level 11) of the National League System. 2008-09 Champions Bletchingley transferred to the Surrey Elite Intermediate League in 2009-10. In 2009-10 Merstham Newton went the entire league season unbeaten to become Premier Division Champions for the second time in five years.

At the end of the 2009-10 season, the league disbanded and its member clubs joined the Mid-Sussex League or the West Sussex League.

Recent champions

The League was reduced to three divisions from 2008-09.

External links
FA Full Time

 
Sport in Crawley
Defunct football leagues in England
Sports leagues disestablished in 2010
2010 disestablishments in England